William Dacre, 5th Baron Dacre (1357–20 July 1398) was an English nobleman and soldier. He was born in 1357, son of Hugh Dacre, 4th Baron Dacre and his wife Ela Maxwell, daughter of Alexander Maxwell of Caerlaverock. He succeeded his father as Baron Dacre upon the latter's death in 1383.

Dacre's military career began in 1382 in Scotland, where he was knighted while serving under the banner of Richard le Scrope. He was part of Richard II's invading army during the 1385 punitive expedition into Scotland.

Dacre was called to give a deposition in the celebrated case of Scrope v Grosvenor. He testified in favour of Scrope, and against Sir Robert Grosvenor.

Dacre married Joan Douglas, said to be an illegitimate daughter of the Earl of Douglas. Their son, Thomas succeeded to the barony upon William Dacre's death in 1398.

Notes

References 

1357 births
1398 deaths
William Dacre, 5th Baron Dacre
5